John Stephen Phillips (May 24, 1919 – June 16, 1958) was an American professional baseball player. He also appeared in one other MLB game as a pinch runner on July 31 of that season against the Boston Braves, but failed to score a run.

Phillips was a native of St. Louis whose pro career lasted for seven seasons (1942–48).

He died in St. Louis by accidental electrocution at the age of 39,
ten years after leaving baseball.

References

External links

1919 births
1958 deaths
Accidental deaths by electrocution
Accidental deaths in Missouri
Baseball players from St. Louis
Binghamton Triplets players
Dallas Rebels players
Hartford Bees players
Hartford Laurels players
Jersey City Giants players
Kansas City Blues (baseball) players
Major League Baseball pitchers
Miami Beach Flamingos players
Montgomery Rebels players
New York Giants (NL) players
Topeka Owls players
West Palm Beach Indians players